The 1953–54 NCAA men's basketball season began in December 1953, progressed through the regular season and conference tournaments, and concluded with the 1954 NCAA basketball tournament championship game on March 20, 1954, at Municipal Auditorium in Kansas City, Missouri. The La Salle Explorers won their first NCAA national championship with a 92–76 victory over the Bradley Braves.

Season headlines 

 The Atlantic Coast Conference began play, with eight original members.
 The NCAA tournament expanded from 22 to 24 teams.
 Kentucky went undefeated, finishing with a 25–0 record. The Helms Athletic Foundation awarded its national championship to Kentucky rather than to the 1954 NCAA basketball tournament champion, La Salle. It was the fourth and final time that the NCAA champion and the Helms champion differed.

Season outlook

Pre-season polls 

The Top 20 from the AP Poll and the UP Coaches Poll during the pre-season.

Conference membership changes

Regular season

Conference winners and tournaments

Statistical leaders

Post-season tournaments

NCAA tournament

Final Four 

 Third Place – Penn State 70, USC 61

National Invitation tournament

Semifinals & finals 

 Third Place – Niagara 71, Western Kentucky State 66

Awards

Consensus All-American teams

Major player of the year awards 

 Helms Player of the Year: Tom Gola, La Salle

Other major awards 

 NIT/Haggerty Award (Top player in New York City metro area): Ed Conlin, Fordham

Coaching changes 

A number of teams changed coaches during the season and after it ended.

References